The 6th Cannes Film Festival was held from 15 to 29 April  1953. The Grand Prix of the Festival went to The Wages of Fear by Henri-Georges Clouzot. The festival opened with Horizons sans fin by Jean Dréville.

During the opening ceremony, Walt Disney was awarded the "Legion of Honour" from the hands of Monsieur Hugues, Minister of Information.

Jury
The following people were appointed as the Jury of the 1953 competition:

Feature films
Jean Cocteau (France) Jury President
Louis Chauvet (France) (journalist)
Titina De Filippo (France)
Guy Desson (France) (MP official)
Philippe Erlanger (France)
Renée Faure (France)
Jacques-Pierre Frogerais (France)
Abel Gance (France)
André Lang (France)
Georges Raguis (France) (union official)
Edward G. Robinson (USA)
Charles Spaak (Belgium)
Georges Van Parys (France)
Short films
Bert Haanstra (Netherlands)
Roger Leenhardt (France)
René Lucot (France)
Jean Queval (France) (journalist)
Jacques Schiltz (France)
Jean Vivie (France) (CST official)

Feature film competition
The following feature films competed for the Grand Prix:

1. April 2000 by Wolfgang Liebeneiner
Awaara by Raj Kapoor
The Bandit of Brazil (O Cangaceiro) by Lima Barreto
Barabbas by Alf Sjöberg
Bongolo by André Cauvin
Call Me Madam by Walter Lang
Children of Hiroshima by Kaneto Shindō
Come Back, Little Sheba by Daniel Mann
Dedication of the Great Buddha (Daibutsu kaigen) by Teinosuke Kinugasa
Doña Francisquita by Ladislao Vajda
Él by Luis Buñuel
Emergency Ward (Sala de guardia) by Tulio Demicheli
Endless Horizons (Horizons sans fin) by Jean Dréville
Flamenco (Duende y misterio del flamenco) by Edgar Neville
For the Sake of My Intemperate Youth (För min heta ungdoms skull) by Arne Mattsson
Gendai-jin by Minoru Shibuya
Green Magic (Magia verde) by Gian Gaspare Napolitano
The Heart of the Matter by George More O'Ferrall
I Confess by Alfred Hitchcock
Intimate Relations by Charles Frank
Light in the High Plains (Luz en el páramo) by Víctor Urruchúa
Lili by Charles Walters
Monsieur Hulot's Holiday (Les vacances de Monsieur Hulot) by Jacques Tati
Perfidy (Nevjera) by Vladimir Pogacic
Peter Pan by Hamilton Luske, Clyde Geronimi and Wilfred Jackson
Rossana (La red) by Emilio Fernández
The Sun Shines Bright by John Ford
Terminal Station by Vittorio De Sica
Las Tres perfectas casadas by Roberto Gavaldón
La vie passionnée de Clémenceau by Gilbert Prouteau
The Village (Sie fanden eine Heimat) by Leopold Lindtberg
The Wages of Fear by Henri-Georges Clouzot
The Wayward Wife (La provinciale) by Mario Soldati
Welcome Mr. Marshall! by Luis García Berlanga
The White Reindeer (Valkoinen peura) by Erik Blomberg

Short film competition
The following short films competed for the Short Film Grand Prix:

 ...And Now Miguel by Joseph Krumgold
 Castilla, soldado de la ley by Enrico Gras
 Doderhultarn by Olle Hellbom
 Doh pyi daung su by Jules Bucher
 Dubrovnik by Milan Katic
 Gazouly, petit oiseau by Wladyslaw Starewicz, L. Starewitcz
 Houen zo! by Herman van der Horst
 I cristalli by Lando Colombo
 Immagini e colore by Vittorio Sala
 Joy of Living by Jean Oser
 Kujira by Noburô Ôhfuji
 Kumaon Hills by Mohan Dayaram Bhavnani
 La montagna di genere by Giovanni Paolucci
 La pintura mural Mexicana by Francisco del Villar
 Land Of The Long Day by Douglas Wilkinson
 Le Luxembourg et son industrie by Philippe Schneider
 Le voyage d'Abdallah by Georges Régnier
 Machu-Picchu by Enrico Gras
 Marionnettes de Toon by Jean Cleinge
 Meister der Gegenwart by Karl von Zieglmayer
 Momoyama bidsutsu by Sôya Mizuki
 Naskara by José Miguel De Mora
 New Lands for Old by Krishna Gopal
 Pescatori di laguna by Antonio Petrucci
 Peter Breughel L'Ancien by Arcady
 Présentation de la beauce à Notre Dame de Chartres by Jacques Berthier
 Pylone 138 by Adolphe Forter
 Remmants of a Stone-Age People by Louis Knobel
 Reverón by Margot Benacerraf
 Royal Heritage by Diana Pine
 Salut Casa! by Jean Vidal
 Schatten Uner Sternen by Ernest Bingen
 So ist das Saarland by Ernest Bingen
 The Figurehead by John Halas
 The Great Experiment by V.R. Sarma
 The Romance of Transportation in Canada by Colin Low
 The Settler by Bernard Devlin
 The Stranger Left No Card by Wendy Toye
 Varen by Gösta Werner
 Victoire sur L'Annapurna by Marcel Ichac
 Vincent Van Gogh by Jan Hulsker
 Water Birds by Ben Sharpsteen
 White Mane (Crin Blanc, Cheval Sauvage) by Albert Lamorisse

Awards

Official awards
The following films and people received the 1953 awards:
Grand Prix: The Wages of Fear by Henri-Georges Clouzot
International Awards:
Award of Visual Narration: Rosanna (La red) by Emilio Fernández
Award of Exploration Film: Green Magic (Magia verde) by Gian Gaspare Napolitano
Award of Fairy Tale Film: The White Reindeer (Valkoinen peura) by Erik Blomberg
Award of Entertainment Film: Lili by Charles Walters
Award of Good Humour: Welcome Mr. Marshall! (¡Bienvenido, Mister Marshall!) by Luis García Berlanga
Award of Adventure Film: The Bandit of Brazil (O Cangaceiro) by Lima Barreto
Award of Dramatic Film: Come Back, Little Sheba by Daniel Mann
Special Mention: Shirley Booth, for Come Back, Little Sheba
Special Mention: Charles Vanel, for The Wages of Fear
Jury Special Prize for his contribution to the prestige of the festival: Walt Disney
Homage: Flamenco (Duende y misterio del flamenco) by Edgar Neville
Short films
Short Film Grand Prix: White Mane by Albert Lamorisse
Best Fictional Film: The Stranger Left No Card by Wendy Toye
Best Documentary Film: Houen zo! by Herman van der Horst
Best Film on Art: Doderhultarn by Olle Hellbom
Best Animation: The Romance of Transportation in Canada by Colin Low

Independent awards
FIPRESCI Prize
Monsieur Hulot's Holiday (Les vacances de Monsieur Hulot) by Jacques Tati
OCIC Award
 Endless Horizons (Horizons sans fin) by Jean Dréville
Other awards
Special Mention:
Juan Antonio Bardem, Luis García Berlanga and Miguel Mihura, for the screenplay of Welcome Mr. Marshall! (¡Bienvenido, Mister Marshall!)
Gabriel Migliori, for the score of The Bandit of Brazil (O Cangaceiro)
For the charming acting in Lili
 For the use of colour in Green Magic (Magia verde)

References

Media
Institut National de l'Audiovisuel: Opening of the 1953 festival (commentary in French)

External links 
1953 Cannes Film Festival (web.archive)
Official website Retrospective 1953 
Cannes Film Festival Awards for 1953 at Internet Movie Database

Cannes Film Festival, 1953
Cannes Film Festival, 1953
Cannes Film Festival